Comedy Nights with Suraj was an Indian Malayalam stand-up comedy and talk show broadcast by Zee Keralam. Hosted by Suraj Venjaramoodu and Aswathy Sreekanth. The show is an essence remake of popular Hindi talk show The Kapil Sharma Show.

The show ended on 28 June 2019 completing 35 episodes.

Plot summary 
Comedian Suraj Venjaramoodu along with Aswathy Sreekanth interacts with celebrity guests about their latest films while keeping the audience laughing with their wit, humor and assorted skits. The show also features various individuals from different walks of life come together to showcase a wide range of talents and impress the audience with their skills.

Cast

Host
 Suraj Venjaramoodu
 Aswathy Sreekanth

Recurring 
 Naseer Sankranthi
 Sneha Sreekumar
 Rajesh Panavally
 Sudhi Kollam
 Ullas Panthalam
 Nelson

List of Episodes

References

External links
 
 

Indian television sketch shows
2019 Indian television series debuts
Malayalam-language television shows
Indian stand-up comedy television series
Zee Keralam original programming